Poaceae or Gramineae is a large and nearly ubiquitous family of monocotyledonous flowering plants in the order Poales, known as grasses. With around 780 genera and around 12,000 species, the Poaceae is the fifth-largest plant family, following the Asteraceae, Orchidaceae, Fabaceae and Rubiaceae.

The Poaceae are the most economically important plant family, providing staple foods from domesticated cereal crops such as maize, wheat, rice, barley, and millet as well as feed for meat-producing animals. They provide, through direct human consumption, just over one-half (51%) of all dietary energy. Some members of the Poaceae are used as building materials (bamboo, thatch, and straw); others can provide a source of biofuel, primarily via the conversion of maize to ethanol. Grasses have stems that are hollow except at the nodes and narrow alternate leaves borne in two ranks. The lower part of each leaf encloses the stem, forming a leaf-sheath. The leaf grows from the base of the blade, an adaptation allowing it to cope with frequent grazing.

Grasslands such as savannah and prairie where grasses are dominant are estimated to constitute 40.5% of the land area of the Earth, excluding Greenland and Antarctica. Grasses are also an important part of the vegetation in many other habitats, including wetlands, forests and tundra.

23,420 species of vascular plant have been recorded in South Africa, making it the sixth most species-rich country in the world and the most species-rich country on the African continent. Of these, 153 species are considered to be threatened. Nine biomes have been described in South Africa: Fynbos, Succulent Karoo, desert, Nama Karoo, grassland, savanna, Albany thickets, the Indian Ocean coastal belt, and forests.

The 2018 South African National Biodiversity Institute's National Biodiversity Assessment plant checklist lists 35,130 taxa in the phyla Anthocerotophyta (hornworts (6)), Anthophyta (flowering plants (33534)), Bryophyta (mosses (685)), Cycadophyta (cycads (42)), Lycopodiophyta (Lycophytes(45)), Marchantiophyta (liverworts (376)), Pinophyta (conifers (33)), and Pteridophyta (cryptogams (408)).

206 genera are represented in the literature. Listed taxa include species, subspecies, varieties, and forms as recorded, some of which have subsequently been allocated to other taxa as synonyms, in which cases the accepted taxon is appended to the listing. Multiple entries under alternative names reflect taxonomic revision over time.

Achnatherum 
Genus Achnatherum:
 Achnatherum clandestinum (Hack.) Barkworth, accepted as Amelichloa clandestina (Hack.) Arriaga & Barkworth, not indigenous, naturalised

Acrachne 
Genus Acrachne:
 Acrachne racemosa (B.Heyne ex Roem. & Schult.) Ohwi, indigenous

Acroceras 
Genus Acroceras:
 Acroceras macrum Stapf, indigenous

Agrostis 
Genus Agrostis:
 Agrostis avenacea C.C.Gmel. not indigenous, naturalised
 Agrostis barbuligera Stapf, indigenous
 Agrostis barbuligera Stapf var. barbuligera, indigenous
 Agrostis barbuligera Stapf var. longipilosa Gooss. & Papendorf, indigenous
 Agrostis bergiana Trin. indigenous
 Agrostis bergiana Trin. var. bergiana, indigenous
 Agrostis bergiana Trin. var. laeviuscula Stapf, indigenous
 Agrostis continuata Stapf, indigenous
 Agrostis eriantha Hack. indigenous
 Agrostis eriantha Hack. var. eriantha, indigenous
 Agrostis eriantha Hack. var. planifolia Gooss. & Papendorf, endemic
 Agrostis gigantea Roth, not indigenous, naturalised
 Agrostis griquensis Stapf, indigenous
 Agrostis lachnantha Nees, indigenous
 Agrostis lachnantha Nees var. lachnantha, indigenous
 Agrostis montevidensis Spreng. ex Nees, not indigenous, naturalised
 Agrostis polypogonoides Stapf, endemic
 Agrostis schlechteri Rendle, endemic
 Agrostis subulifolia Stapf, indigenous

Aira 
Genus Aira:
 Aira cupaniana Guss. not indigenous, naturalised
 Aira praecox L. not indigenous, naturalised

Alloteropsis 
Genus Alloteropsis:
 Alloteropsis papillosa Clayton, indigenous
 Alloteropsis semialata (R.Br.) Hitchc. indigenous
 Alloteropsis semialata (R.Br.) Hitchc. subsp. eckloniana (Nees) Gibbs Russ. indigenous
 Alloteropsis semialata (R.Br.) Hitchc. subsp. semialata, indigenous

Alopecurus 
Genus Alopecurus:
 Alopecurus arundinaceus Poir. not indigenous, naturalised

Amelichloa 
Genus Amelichloa:
 Amelichloa clandestina (Hack.) Arriaga & Barkworth, not indigenous, naturalised

Ammophila 
Genus Ammophila:
 Ammophila arenaria (L.) Link, not indigenous, naturalised, invasive

Andropogon 
Genus Andropogon:
 Andropogon amethystinus Steud. indigenous
 Andropogon appendiculatus Nees, indigenous
 Andropogon chinensis (Nees) Merr. indigenous
 Andropogon distachyos L. indigenous
 Andropogon eucomus Nees, indigenous
 Andropogon fastigiatus Sw. indigenous
 Andropogon festuciformis Rendle, indigenous
 Andropogon gayanus Kunth, indigenous
 Andropogon gayanus Kunth var. polycladus (Hack.) Clayton, indigenous
 Andropogon huillensis Rendle, indigenous
 Andropogon lacunosus J.G.Anderson, indigenous
 Andropogon laxatus Stapf, indigenous
 Andropogon mannii Hook.f. indigenous
 Andropogon ravus J.G.Anderson, indigenous
 Andropogon schirensis Hochst. ex A.Rich. indigenous

Anthephora 
Genus Anthephora:
 Anthephora argentea Gooss. indigenous
 Anthephora pubescens Nees, indigenous
 Anthephora ramosa Gooss. accepted as Anthephora pubescens Nees, present
 Anthephora schinzii Hack. indigenous

Anthoxanthum 
Genus Anthoxanthum:
 Anthoxanthum brevifolium Stapf, endemic
 Anthoxanthum dregeanum (Nees) Stapf, endemic
 Anthoxanthum ecklonii (Nees ex Trin.) Stapf, indigenous
 Anthoxanthum odoratum L. var. odoratum, not indigenous, naturalised
 Anthoxanthum tongo (Trin.) Stapf, endemic

Aristida 
Genus Aristida:
 Aristida adscensionis L. indigenous
 Aristida aequiglumis Hack. indigenous
 Aristida bifida Karl, accepted as Stipagrostis obtusa (Delile) Nees 
 Aristida bipartita (Nees) Trin. & Rupr. indigenous
 Aristida canescens Henrard, indigenous
 Aristida canescens Henrard subsp. canescens, indigenous
 Aristida canescens Henrard subsp. ramosa De Winter, endemic
 Aristida congesta Roem. & Schult. indigenous
 Aristida congesta Roem. & Schult. subsp. barbicollis (Trin. & Rupr.) De Winter, indigenous
 Aristida congesta Roem. & Schult. subsp. congesta, indigenous
 Aristida curvata (Nees) T.Durand & Schinz var. nana Henrard, accepted as Aristida adscensionis L. present
 Aristida dasydesmis (Pilg.) Mez, endemic
 Aristida diffusa Trin. indigenous
 Aristida diffusa Trin. subsp. burkei (Stapf) Melderis, indigenous
 Aristida diffusa Trin. subsp. diffusa, endemic
 Aristida effusa Henrard, indigenous
 Aristida engleri Mez, indigenous
 Aristida engleri Mez var. engleri, indigenous
 Aristida engleri Mez var. ramosissima De Winter, indigenous
 Aristida junciformis Trin. & Rupr. indigenous
 Aristida junciformis Trin. & Rupr. subsp. galpinii (Stapf) De Winter, indigenous
 Aristida junciformis Trin. & Rupr. subsp. junciformis, indigenous
 Aristida meridionalis Henrard, indigenous
 Aristida mollissima Pilg. indigenous
 Aristida mollissima Pilg. subsp. argentea (Schweick.) Melderis, indigenous
 Aristida mollissima Pilg. subsp. mollissima, indigenous
 Aristida monticola Henrard, endemic
 Aristida parvula (Nees) De Winter, indigenous
 Aristida pilgeri Henrard, indigenous
 Aristida recta Franch. indigenous
 Aristida rhiniochloa Hochst. indigenous
 Aristida scabrivalvis Hack. indigenous
 Aristida scabrivalvis Hack. subsp. contracta (De Winter) Melderis, indigenous
 Aristida scabrivalvis Hack. subsp. scabrivalvis, indigenous
 Aristida sciurus Stapf, indigenous
 Aristida spectabilis Hack. indigenous
 Aristida stipitata Hack. indigenous
 Aristida stipitata Hack. subsp. graciliflora (Pilg.) Melderis, indigenous
 Aristida stipitata Hack. subsp. robusta (Stent & J.M.Rattray) Melderis, indigenous
 Aristida stipitata Hack. subsp. spicata (De Winter) Melderis, indigenous
 Aristida stipitata Hack. subsp. stipitata, indigenous
 Aristida transvaalensis Henrard, indigenous
 Aristida vestita Thunb. indigenous
 Aristida vestita Thunb. var. eckloniana Trin. & Rupr. accepted as Aristida diffusa Trin. subsp. diffusa, present

Arrhenatherum 
Genus Arrhenatherum:
 Arrhenatherum elatius (L.) J.Presl & C.Presl, not indigenous, naturalised

Arthratherum 
Genus Arthratherum:
 Arthratherum capense Nees var. macropus Nees, accepted as Stipagrostis zeyheri (Nees) De Winter subsp. macropus (Nees) De Winter, present
 Arthratherum subacaule Nees, accepted as Stipagrostis subacaulis (Nees) De Winter, present
 Arthratherum zeyheri Nees, accepted as Stipagrostis zeyheri (Nees) De Winter subsp. zeyheri, present

Arthraxon 
Genus Arthraxon:
 Arthraxon lanceolatus (Roxb.) Hochst. indigenous
 Arthraxon lanceolatus (Roxb.) Hochst. var. lanceolatus, indigenous

Arundinella 
Genus Arundinella:
 Arundinella nepalensis Trin. indigenous

Arundo 
Genus Arundo:
 Arundo donax L. not indigenous, naturalised, invasive

Avena 
Genus Avena:
 Avena barbata Pott ex Link, not indigenous, naturalised
 Avena byzantina K.Koch, not indigenous, naturalised
 Avena fatua L. not indigenous, naturalised
 Avena sativa L. not indigenous, naturalised
 Avena sterilis L. not indigenous, naturalised

Axonopus 
Genus Axonopus:
 Axonopus affinis Chase, not indigenous, naturalised

Bambusa 
Genus Bambusa:
 Bambusa balcooa Roxb. ex Roxb. not indigenous, naturalised

Bewsia 
Genus Bewsia:
 Bewsia biflora (Hack.) Gooss. indigenous

Bothriochloa 
Genus Bothriochloa:
 Bothriochloa bladhii (Retz.) S.T.Blake, indigenous
 Bothriochloa insculpta (Hochst. ex A.Rich.) A.Camus, indigenous
 Bothriochloa radicans (Lehm.) A.Camus, indigenous

Brachiaria 
Genus Brachiaria:
 Brachiaria advena Vickery, not indigenous, naturalised
 Brachiaria arrecta (Hack. ex T.Durand & Schinz) Stent, indigenous
 Brachiaria bovonei (Chiov.) Robyns, indigenous
 Brachiaria brizantha (A.Rich.) Stapf, indigenous
 Brachiaria chusqueoides (Hack.) Clayton, indigenous
 Brachiaria deflexa (Schumach.) C.E.Hubb. ex Robyns [1], indigenous
 Brachiaria dictyoneura (Fig. & De Not.) Stapf, indigenous
 Brachiaria dura Stapf, indigenous
 Brachiaria dura Stapf var. pilosa J.G.Anderson, indigenous
 Brachiaria eruciformis (Sm.) Griseb. indigenous
 Brachiaria glomerata (Hack.) A.Camus, indigenous
 Brachiaria grossa Stapf, indigenous
 Brachiaria humidicola (Rendle) Schweick. indigenous
 Brachiaria marlothii (Hack.) Stent, indigenous
 Brachiaria nigropedata (Ficalho & Hiern) Stapf, indigenous
 Brachiaria serrata (Thunb.) Stapf, indigenous
 Brachiaria subulifolia (Mez) Clayton, indigenous
 Brachiaria umbellata (Trin.) Clayton, not indigenous, naturalised
 Brachiaria xantholeuca (Schinz) Stapf, indigenous

Brachychloa 
Genus Brachychloa:
 Brachychloa fragilis S.M.Phillips, indigenous
 Brachychloa schiemanniana (Schweick.) S.M.Phillips, indigenous

Brachypodium 
Genus Brachypodium:
 Brachypodium bolusii Stapf, indigenous
 Brachypodium distachyon (L.) P.Beauv. not indigenous, naturalised
 Brachypodium flexum Nees, indigenous
 Brachypodium fontanesianum Nees, accepted as Brachypodium flexum Nees, present

Briza 
Genus Briza:
 Briza geniculata Thunb. not indigenous, naturalised
 Briza maxima L. not indigenous, naturalised
 Briza minor L. not indigenous, naturalised
 Briza subaristatum Lam. not indigenous, naturalised

Brizopyrum 
Genus Brizopyrum:
 Brizopyrum acutiflorum Nees, accepted as Brizopyrum acutiflorum Nees var. maius Nees, present
 Brizopyrum acutiflorum Nees var. capillaris Nees, accepted as Tribolium acutiflorum (Nees) Renvoize, present
 Brizopyrum alternans Nees, accepted as Tribolium uniolae (L.f.) Renvoize, present
 Brizopyrum capense Trin. var. brachystachyum Nees, accepted as Tribolium brachystachyum (Nees) Renvoize, present
 Brizopyrum obliterum Stapf, accepted as Tribolium obliterum (Hemsl.) Renvoize, present

Bromus 
Genus Bromus:
 Bromus alopecurus Poir. not indigenous, naturalised
 Bromus catharticus Vahl, not indigenous, naturalised
 Bromus commutatus Schrad. not indigenous, naturalised
 Bromus diandrus Roth, not indigenous, naturalised
 Bromus firmior (Nees) Stapf, indigenous
 Bromus hordeaceus L. not indigenous, naturalised
 Bromus hordeaceus L. subsp. ferronii (Mabille) P.M.Sm. not indigenous, naturalised
 Bromus hordeaceus L. subsp. molliformis (J.Lloyd) Maire & Weiller, not indigenous, naturalised
 Bromus inermis Leyss. not indigenous, naturalised
 Bromus leptoclados Nees, indigenous
 Bromus madritensis L. not indigenous, naturalised
 Bromus natalensis Stapf, indigenous
 Bromus pectinatus Thunb. indigenous
 Bromus rigidus Roth, not indigenous, naturalised
 Bromus speciosus Nees, indigenous
 Bromus speciosus Nees var. firmior Nees, accepted as Bromus firmior (Nees) Stapf, present
 Bromus tectorum L. not indigenous, naturalised

Calamagrostis 
Genus Calamagrostis:
 Calamagrostis epigejos (L.) Roth, indigenous
 Calamagrostis epigejos (L.) Roth var. capensis Stapf, indigenous

Capeochloa 
Genus Capeochloa:
 Capeochloa arundinacea (P.J.Bergius) N.P.Barker & H.P.Linder, indigenous
 Capeochloa cincta (Nees) N.P.Barker & H.P.Linder, indigenous
 Capeochloa cincta (Nees) N.P.Barker & H.P.Linder subsp. cincta, indigenous
 Capeochloa cincta (Nees) N.P.Barker & H.P.Linder subsp. sericea (N.P.Barker) N.P.Barker & H.P.Linder, indigenous
 Capeochloa setacea (N.P.Barker) N.P.Barker & H.P.Linder, indigenous

Catalepis 
Genus Catalepis:
 Catalepis gracilis Stapf & Stent, indigenous

Catapodium 
Genus Catapodium:
 Catapodium rigidum (L.) C.E.Hubb. not indigenous, naturalised

Cenchrus 
Genus Cenchrus:
 Cenchrus biflorus Roxb. not indigenous, naturalised
 Cenchrus brownii Roem. & Schult. not indigenous, naturalised
 Cenchrus ciliaris L. indigenous
 Cenchrus incertus M.A.Curtis, not indigenous, naturalised

Centropodia 
Genus Centropodia:
 Centropodia glauca (Nees) Cope, indigenous

Chaetobromus 
Genus Chaetobromus:
 Chaetobromus dregeanus Nees [1], accepted as Chaetobromus involucratus (Schrad.) Nees subsp. dregeanus (Nees) Verboom, present
 Chaetobromus involucratus (Schrad.) Nees, indigenous
 Chaetobromus involucratus (Schrad.) Nees subsp. dregeanus (Nees) Verboom, endemic
 Chaetobromus involucratus (Schrad.) Nees subsp. involucratus, endemic
 Chaetobromus involucratus (Schrad.) Nees subsp. sericeus (Nees) Verboom, indigenous
 Chaetobromus schlechteri Pilg. accepted as Chaetobromus involucratus (Schrad.) Nees subsp. dregeanus (Nees) Verboom, present
 Chaetobromus schraderi Stapf, accepted as Chaetobromus involucratus (Schrad.) Nees subsp. involucratus, present

Chloris 
Genus Chloris:
 Chloris diluta Renvoize, indigenous
 Chloris gayana Kunth, indigenous
 Chloris mossambicensis K.Schum. indigenous
 Chloris pycnothrix Trin. indigenous
 Chloris roxburghiana Schult. indigenous
 Chloris truncata R.Br. not indigenous, naturalised
 Chloris virgata Sw. indigenous

Chrysopogon 
Genus Chrysopogon:
 Chrysopogon serrulatus Trin. indigenous

Cladoraphis 
Genus Cladoraphis:
 Cladoraphis cyperoides (Thunb.) S.M.Phillips, indigenous
 Cladoraphis spinosa (L.f.) S.M.Phillips, indigenous

Cleistachne 
Genus Cleistachne:
 Cleistachne sorghoides Benth. indigenous

Coelachyrum 
Genus Coelachyrum:
 Coelachyrum yemenicum (Schweinf.) S.M.Phillips, indigenous

Coelorachis 
Genus Coelorachis:
 Coelorachis capensis Stapf, endemic

Coix 
Genus Coix:
 Coix lacryma-jobi L. not indigenous, naturalised

Colpodium 
Genus Colpodium:
 Colpodium drakensbergense Hedberg & I.Hedberg, accepted as Catabrosa drakensbergense (Hedberg & I.Hedberg) Soreng & Fish, indigenous

Cortaderia 
Genus Cortaderia:
 Cortaderia jubata (Lemoine ex Carriere) Stapf, not indigenous, naturalised, invasive
 Cortaderia selloana (Schult.) Asch. & Graebn. not indigenous, naturalised, invasive

Corynephorus 
Genus Corynephorus:
 Corynephorus fasciculatus Boiss. & Reut. not indigenous, naturalised

Craspedorhachis 
Genus Craspedorhachis:
 Craspedorhachis africana Benth. indigenous

Ctenium 
Genus Ctenium:
 Ctenium concinnum Nees, indigenous

Cymbopogon 
Genus Cymbopogon:
 Cymbopogon caesius (Hook. & Arn.) Stapf, indigenous
 Cymbopogon dieterlenii Stapf ex E.Phillips, indigenous
 Cymbopogon excavatus (Hochst.) Stapf ex Burtt Davy, accepted as Cymbopogon caesius (Hook. & Arn.) Stapf, present
 Cymbopogon marginatus (Steud.) Stapf ex Burtt Davy, indigenous
 Cymbopogon nardus (L.) Rendle, indigenous
 Cymbopogon plurinodis (Stapf) Stapf ex Burtt Davy, accepted as Cymbopogon pospischilii (K.Schum.) C.E.Hubb. present
 Cymbopogon pospischilii (K.Schum.) C.E.Hubb. indigenous
 Cymbopogon prolixus (Stapf) E.Phillips, indigenous
 Cymbopogon validus (Stapf) Stapf ex Burtt Davy, accepted as Cymbopogon nardus (L.) Rendle, present

Cynodon 
Genus Cynodon:
 Cynodon aethiopicus Clayton & Harlan, not indigenous, naturalised, invasive
 Cynodon bradleyi Stent, endemic
 Cynodon dactylon (L.) Pers. indigenous
 Cynodon hirsutus Stent, indigenous
 Cynodon hirsutus Stent var. hirsutus, endemic
 Cynodon hirsutus Stent var. parviglumis Stent, indigenous
 Cynodon incompletus Nees, endemic
 Cynodon nlemfuensis Vanderyst, not indigenous, naturalised, invasive
 Cynodon polevansii Stent, endemic
 Cynodon transvaalensis Burtt Davy, indigenous

Cynosurus 
Genus Cynosurus:
 Cynosurus coloratus Lehm. ex Nees, not indigenous, naturalised
 Cynosurus echinatus L. not indigenous, naturalised, invasive

Dactylis 
Genus Dactylis:
 Dactylis glomerata L. not indigenous, naturalised, invasive

Dactyloctenium 
Genus Dactyloctenium:
 Dactyloctenium aegyptium (L.) Willd. indigenous
 Dactyloctenium australe Steud. indigenous
 Dactyloctenium geminatum Hack. indigenous
 Dactyloctenium giganteum Fisher & Schweick. indigenous

Danthonia 
Genus Danthonia:
 Danthonia angustifolia Nees, accepted as Pentaschistis pallida (Thunb.) H.P.Linder, present
 Danthonia angustifolia Nees var. micrathera Nees, accepted as Pentameris glandulosa (Schrad.) Steud. present
 Danthonia densifolia Nees, accepted as Pentameris densifolia (Nees) Steud. present
 Danthonia heptamera Nees, accepted as Pentameris heptameris (Nees) Steud. present
 Danthonia holciformis Nees, accepted as Pentameris holciformis (Nees) Galley & H.P.Linder, present
 Danthonia lima Nees, accepted as Pentameris lima (Nees) Steud. present

Danthoniopsis 
Genus Danthoniopsis:
 Danthoniopsis dinteri (Pilg.) C.E.Hubb. indigenous
 Danthoniopsis parva (J.B.Phipps) Clayton, endemic
 Danthoniopsis pruinosa C.E.Hubb. indigenous
 Danthoniopsis ramosa (Stapf) Clayton, indigenous
 Danthoniopsis scopulorum (J.B.Phipps) J.B.Phipps, endemic

Deschampsia 
Genus Deschampsia:
 Deschampsia caespitosa (L.) P.Beauv. not indigenous, naturalised
 Deschampsia flexuosa (L.) Trin. not indigenous, naturalised

Desmazeria 
Genus Desmazeria:
 Desmazeria composita Hack. accepted as Tribolium obtusifolium (Nees) Renvoize, present

Diandrochloa 
Genus Diandrochloa:
 Diandrochloa namaquensis (Nees) De Winter, indigenous
 Diandrochloa pusilla (Hack.) De Winter, indigenous

Dichanthium 
Genus Dichanthium:
 Dichanthium annulatum (Forssk.) Stapf, indigenous
 Dichanthium annulatum (Forssk.) Stapf var. papillosum (A.Rich.) de Wet & Harlan, indigenous
 Dichanthium aristatum (Poir.) C.E.Hubb. not indigenous, naturalised

Digitaria 
Genus Digitaria:
 Digitaria argyrograpta (Nees) Stapf, indigenous
 Digitaria argyrotricha (Andersson) Chiov. indigenous
 Digitaria brazzae (Franch.) Stapf, indigenous
 Digitaria ciliaris (Retz.) Koeler, not indigenous, naturalised
 Digitaria debilis (Desf.) Willd. indigenous
 Digitaria diagonalis (Nees) Stapf, indigenous
 Digitaria diagonalis (Nees) Stapf var. diagonalis, indigenous
 Digitaria didactyla Willd. not indigenous, naturalised
 Digitaria diversinervis (Nees) Stapf, endemic
 Digitaria eriantha Steud. indigenous
 Digitaria eylesii C.E.Hubb. indigenous
 Digitaria flaccida Stapf, indigenous
 Digitaria glauca Stent var. bechuanica Stent, accepted as Digitaria eriantha Steud. present
 Digitaria gymnostachys Pilg. indigenous
 Digitaria hiascens Mez, accepted as Digitaria eriantha Steud. present
 Digitaria longiflora (Retz.) Pers. indigenous
 Digitaria maitlandii Stapf & C.E.Hubb. indigenous
 Digitaria milanjiana (Rendle) Stapf, indigenous
 Digitaria monodactyla (Nees) Stapf, indigenous
 Digitaria natalensis Stent, indigenous
 Digitaria nuda Schumach. not indigenous, naturalised
 Digitaria perrottetii (Kunth) Stapf, indigenous
 Digitaria polyphylla Henrard, indigenous
 Digitaria rukwae Clayton, indigenous
 Digitaria sanguinalis (L.) Scop. not indigenous, naturalised
 Digitaria scalarum (Schweinf.) Chiov. indigenous
 Digitaria seriata Stapf, indigenous
 Digitaria setifolia Stapf, indigenous
 Digitaria ternata (A.Rich.) Stapf, indigenous
 Digitaria thouarsiana (Flugge) A.Camus, indigenous
 Digitaria tricholaenoides Stapf, indigenous
 Digitaria velutina (Forssk.) P.Beauv. indigenous
 Digitaria violascens Link, not indigenous, naturalised

Diheteropogon 
Genus Diheteropogon:
 Diheteropogon amplectens (Nees) Clayton, indigenous
 Diheteropogon amplectens (Nees) Clayton var. amplectens, indigenous
 Diheteropogon filifolius (Nees) Clayton, indigenous

Dinebra 
Genus Dinebra:
 Dinebra retroflexa (Vahl) Panz. indigenous
 Dinebra retroflexa (Vahl) Panz. var. condensata S.M.Phillips, indigenous

Diplachne 
Genus Diplachne:
 Diplachne cuspidata Launert, accepted as Leptochloa fusca (L.) Kunth 
 Diplachne eleusine Nees, accepted as Leptochloa eleusine (Nees) Cope & N.Snow, present
 Diplachne fusca (L.) P.Beauv. ex Roem. & Schult. accepted as Leptochloa fusca (L.) Kunth, present
 Diplachne gigantea Launert, accepted as Leptochloa gigantea (Launert) Cope & N.Snow 
 Diplachne pallida Hack. accepted as Leptochloa fusca (L.) Kunth, present

Dregeochloa 
Genus Dregeochloa:
 Dregeochloa calviniensis Conert, endemic
 Dregeochloa pumila (Nees) Conert, indigenous

Echinochloa 
Genus Echinochloa:
 Echinochloa colona (L.) Link, indigenous
 Echinochloa crus-galli (L.) P.Beauv. indigenous
 Echinochloa crus-pavonis (Kunth) Schult. indigenous
 Echinochloa haploclada (Stapf) Stapf, indigenous
 Echinochloa holubii (Stapf) Stapf, indigenous
 Echinochloa jubata Stapf, indigenous
 Echinochloa pyramidalis (Lam.) Hitchc. & Chase, indigenous
 Echinochloa stagnina (Retz.) P.Beauv. indigenous
 Echinochloa ugandensis Snowden & C.E.Hubb. indigenous

Ehrharta 
Genus Ehrharta:
 Ehrharta barbinodis Nees ex Trin. endemic
 Ehrharta brachylemma Pilg. accepted as Ehrharta brevifolia Schrad. var. brevifolia, present
 Ehrharta brevifolia Schrad. indigenous
 Ehrharta brevifolia Schrad. var. brevifolia, indigenous
 Ehrharta brevifolia Schrad. var. cuspidata Nees, indigenous
 Ehrharta bulbosa Sm. endemic
 Ehrharta calycina Sm. indigenous
 Ehrharta capensis Thunb. endemic
 Ehrharta delicatula Stapf, indigenous
 Ehrharta dura Nees ex Trin. endemic
 Ehrharta eburnea Gibbs Russ. endemic
 Ehrharta erecta Lam. indigenous
 Ehrharta erecta Lam. var. erecta, indigenous
 Ehrharta erecta Lam. var. natalensis Stapf, indigenous
 Ehrharta longiflora Sm. indigenous
 Ehrharta longifolia Schrad. endemic
 Ehrharta longigluma C.E.Hubb. indigenous
 Ehrharta melicoides Thunb. endemic
 Ehrharta microlaena Nees ex Trin. endemic
 Ehrharta ottonis Kunth ex Nees, endemic
 Ehrharta pusilla Nees ex Trin. indigenous
 Ehrharta ramosa (Thunb.) Thunb. indigenous
 Ehrharta ramosa (Thunb.) Thunb. subsp. aphylla (Schrad.) Gibbs Russ. endemic
 Ehrharta ramosa (Thunb.) Thunb. subsp. ramosa, endemic
 Ehrharta rehmannii Stapf, indigenous
 Ehrharta rehmannii Stapf subsp. filiformis (Stapf) Gibbs Russ. endemic
 Ehrharta rehmannii Stapf subsp. rehmannii, endemic
 Ehrharta rehmannii Stapf subsp. subspicata (Stapf) Gibbs Russ. endemic
 Ehrharta rupestris Nees ex Trin. indigenous
 Ehrharta rupestris Nees ex Trin. subsp. dodii (Stapf) Gibbs Russ. endemic
 Ehrharta rupestris Nees ex Trin. subsp. rupestris, endemic
 Ehrharta rupestris Nees ex Trin. subsp. tricostata (Stapf) Gibbs Russ. endemic
 Ehrharta schlechteri Rendle, accepted as Ehrharta brevifolia Schrad. var. cuspidata Nees, present
 Ehrharta setacea Nees, indigenous
 Ehrharta setacea Nees subsp. disticha (Stapf) Gibbs Russ. endemic
 Ehrharta setacea Nees subsp. scabra (Stapf) Gibbs Russ. endemic
 Ehrharta setacea Nees subsp. setacea, endemic
 Ehrharta setacea Nees subsp. uniflora (Burch. ex Stapf) Gibbs Russ. endemic
 Ehrharta thunbergii Gibbs Russ. indigenous
 Ehrharta triandra Nees ex Trin. indigenous
 Ehrharta villosa Schult.f. indigenous
 Ehrharta villosa Schult.f. var. maxima Stapf, endemic
 Ehrharta villosa Schult.f. var. villosa, endemic

Eleusine 
Genus Eleusine:
 Eleusine coracana (L.) Gaertn. indigenous
 Eleusine coracana (L.) Gaertn. subsp. africana (Kenn.-O'Byrne) Hilu & de Wet, indigenous
 Eleusine indica (L.) Gaertn. indigenous
 Eleusine multiflora A.Rich. not indigenous, naturalised
 Eleusine tristachya (Lam.) Lam. not indigenous, naturalised

Elionurus 
Genus Elionurus:
 Elionurus muticus (Spreng.) Kunth, indigenous

Elymandra 
Genus Elymandra:
 Elymandra grallata (Stapf) Clayton, indigenous

Elymus 
Genus Elymus:
 Elymus repens (L.) Gould, accepted as Elytrigia repens (L.) Nevski, not indigenous, naturalised

Elytrigia 
Genus Elytrigia:
 Elytrigia repens (L.) Nevski, not indigenous, naturalised

Elytrophorus 
Genus Elytrophorus:
 Elytrophorus globularis Hack. indigenous

Enneapogon 
Genus Enneapogon:
 Enneapogon cenchroides (Licht. ex Roem. & Schult.) C.E.Hubb. indigenous
 Enneapogon desvauxii P.Beauv. indigenous
 Enneapogon pretoriensis Stent, indigenous
 Enneapogon scaber Lehm. indigenous
 Enneapogon scoparius Stapf, indigenous
 Enneapogon spathaceus Gooss. endemic

Enteropogon 
Genus Enteropogon:
 Enteropogon macrostachyus (Hochst. ex A.Rich.) Munro ex Benth. indigenous
 Enteropogon monostachyus (Vahl) K.Schum. indigenous
 Enteropogon monostachyus (Vahl) K.Schum. subsp. africanus Clayton, indigenous
 Enteropogon muticus Hack. accepted as Rendlia altera (Rendle) Chiov. present

Entolasia 
Genus Entolasia:
 Entolasia olivacea Stapf, indigenous

Eragrostis 
Genus Eragrostis:
 Eragrostis acraea De Winter, indigenous
 Eragrostis aethiopica Chiov. indigenous
 Eragrostis amabilis (L.) Hook. & Arn. indigenous
 Eragrostis annulata Rendle ex Scott-Elliot, indigenous
 Eragrostis arenicola C.E.Hubb. indigenous
 Eragrostis aspera (Jacq.) Nees, indigenous
 Eragrostis barbinodis Hack. indigenous
 Eragrostis barrelieri Daveau, not indigenous, naturalised
 Eragrostis bergiana (Kunth) Trin. indigenous
 Eragrostis bicolor Nees, indigenous
 Eragrostis biflora Hack. ex Schinz, indigenous
 Eragrostis brizantha Nees, indigenous
 Eragrostis caesia Stapf, indigenous
 Eragrostis capensis (Thunb.) Trin. indigenous
 Eragrostis capillifolia Nees, accepted as Eragrostis curvula (Schrad.) Nees, present
 Eragrostis chapelieri (Kunth) Nees, indigenous
 Eragrostis chloromelas Steud. indigenous
 Eragrostis cilianensis (All.) Vignolo ex Janch. indigenous
 Eragrostis ciliaris (L.) R.Br. indigenous
 Eragrostis congesta Oliv. indigenous
 Eragrostis crassinervis Hack. indigenous
 Eragrostis curvula (Schrad.) Nees, indigenous
 Eragrostis cylindriflora Hochst. indigenous
 Eragrostis desolata Launert, indigenous
 Eragrostis echinochloidea Stapf, indigenous
 Eragrostis elatior Stapf, endemic
 Eragrostis elatior Stapf var. burchellii Stapf, accepted as Eragrostis elatior Stapf, indigenous
 Eragrostis glabrata Nees, accepted as Eragrostis sabulosa (Steud.) Schweick. present
 Eragrostis glandulosipedata De Winter, indigenous
 Eragrostis gummiflua Nees, indigenous
 Eragrostis habrantha Rendle, indigenous
 Eragrostis hereroensis Hack. accepted as Eragrostis porosa Nees 
 Eragrostis heteromera Stapf, indigenous
 Eragrostis hierniana Rendle, indigenous
 Eragrostis homomalla Nees, indigenous
 Eragrostis inamoena K.Schum. indigenous
 Eragrostis kingesii De Winter, indigenous
 Eragrostis lamprospicula De Winter, accepted as Eragrostis patentipilosa Hack. present
 Eragrostis lappula Nees, indigenous
 Eragrostis lehmanniana Nees, indigenous
 Eragrostis lehmanniana Nees var. chaunantha (Pilg.) De Winter, indigenous
 Eragrostis lehmanniana Nees var. lehmanniana, indigenous
 Eragrostis leptocalymma Pilg. accepted as Eragrostis trichophora Coss. & Durieu 
 Eragrostis macrochlamys Pilg. indigenous
 Eragrostis macrochlamys Pilg. var. macrochlamys, indigenous
 Eragrostis macrochlamys Pilg. var. wilmaniae (C.E.Hubb. & Schweick.) De Winter, indigenous
 Eragrostis mexicana (Hornem.) Link subsp. virescens (J.Presl) S.D.Koch & Sanchez Vega, not indigenous, naturalised
 Eragrostis micrantha Hack. indigenous
 Eragrostis minor Host, not indigenous, naturalised
 Eragrostis moggii De Winter, indigenous
 Eragrostis moggii De Winter var. moggii, indigenous
 Eragrostis nindensis Ficalho & Hiern, indigenous
 Eragrostis obtusa Munro ex Ficalho & Hiern, indigenous
 Eragrostis pallens Hack. indigenous
 Eragrostis patens Oliv. indigenous
 Eragrostis patentipilosa Hack. indigenous
 Eragrostis patentissima Hack. indigenous
 Eragrostis phyllacantha Cope, indigenous
 Eragrostis pilgeriana Dinter ex Pilg. indigenous
 Eragrostis pilosa (L.) P.Beauv. indigenous
 Eragrostis plana Nees, indigenous
 Eragrostis planiculmis Nees, indigenous
 Eragrostis porosa Nees, indigenous
 Eragrostis procumbens Nees, indigenous
 Eragrostis pseudopoa C.E.Hubb. indigenous
 Eragrostis pseudosclerantha Chiov. accepted as Eragrostis patentipilosa Hack. present
 Eragrostis pseudoteff Peter, accepted as Eragrostis lehmanniana Nees var. lehmanniana, present
 Eragrostis pusilla Hack. accepted as Diandrochloa pusilla (Hack.) De Winter 
 Eragrostis racemosa (Thunb.) Steud. indigenous
 Eragrostis remotiflora De Winter, endemic
 Eragrostis rigidior Pilg. indigenous
 Eragrostis rotifer Rendle, indigenous
 Eragrostis sabulosa (Steud.) Schweick. endemic
 Eragrostis sarmentosa (Thunb.) Trin. indigenous
 Eragrostis sclerantha Nees, indigenous
 Eragrostis sclerantha Nees subsp. sclerantha, indigenous
 Eragrostis sclerantha Nees subsp. villosipes (Jedwabn.) Launert, indigenous
 Eragrostis stapfii De Winter, indigenous
 Eragrostis superba Peyr. indigenous
 Eragrostis tef (Zuccagni) Trotter, not indigenous, naturalised
 Eragrostis tenella (L.) Roem. & Schult. accepted as Eragrostis amabilis (L.) Hook. & Arn. present
 Eragrostis tenuifolia (A.Rich.) Steud. indigenous
 Eragrostis trichophora Coss. & Durieu, indigenous
 Eragrostis truncata Hack. indigenous
 Eragrostis virescens J.Presl, accepted as Eragrostis mexicana (Hornem.) Link subsp. virescens (J.Presl) S.D.Koch & Sanchez Vega, not indigenous, naturalised
 Eragrostis viscosa (Retz.) Trin. indigenous
 Eragrostis volkensii Pilg. indigenous
 Eragrostis x pseudobtusa De Winter, endemic

Eriachne 
Genus Eriachne:
 Eriachne ecklonii Nees, accepted as Pentameris bachmannii (McClean) Galley & H.P.Linder, present
 Eriachne microphylla Nees, accepted as Pentameris microphylla (Nees) Galley & H.P.Linder, present

Eriochloa 
Genus Eriochloa:
 Eriochloa fatmensis (Hochst. & Steud.) Clayton, indigenous
 Eriochloa meyeriana (Nees) Pilg. [1], indigenous
 Eriochloa meyeriana (Nees) Pilg. subsp. grandiglumis (Stent & J.M.Rattray) Gibbs Russ. indigenous
 Eriochloa meyeriana (Nees) Pilg. subsp. meyeriana, indigenous
 Eriochloa parvispiculata C.E.Hubb. indigenous
 Eriochloa stapfiana Clayton, indigenous

Eriochrysis 
Genus Eriochrysis:
 Eriochrysis brachypogon (Stapf) Stapf, indigenous
 Eriochrysis pallida Munro, indigenous

Eulalia 
Genus Eulalia:
 Eulalia aurea (Bory) Kunth, indigenous
 Eulalia villosa (Thunb.) Nees, indigenous

Eustachys 
Genus Eustachys:
 Eustachys paspaloides (Vahl) Lanza & Mattei, indigenous

Festuca 
Genus Festuca:
 Festuca africana (Hack.) Clayton, indigenous
 Festuca arundinacea Schreb. not indigenous, naturalised
 Festuca caprina Nees, indigenous
 Festuca caprina Nees var. curvula Lehm. accepted as Festuca caprina Nees, present
 Festuca costata Nees, indigenous
 Festuca costata Nees var. fascicularis Nees, accepted as Festuca costata Nees, present
 Festuca dracomontana H.P.Linder, indigenous
 Festuca elatior L. accepted as Festuca arundinacea Schreb. not indigenous, naturalised
 Festuca killickii Kenn.-O'Byrne, endemic
 Festuca longipes Stapf, indigenous
 Festuca scabra Vahl, indigenous
 Festuca vulpioides Steud. endemic

Fingerhuthia 
Genus Fingerhuthia:
 Fingerhuthia africana Lehm. indigenous
 Fingerhuthia sesleriiformis Nees, indigenous

Gastridium 
Genus Gastridium:
 Gastridium phleoides (Nees & Meyen) C.E.Hubb. not indigenous, naturalised

Geochloa 
Genus Geochloa:
 Geochloa decora (Nees) N.P.Barker & H.P.Linder, endemic
 Geochloa lupulina (L.f.) N.P.Barker & H.P.Linder, endemic
 Geochloa rufa (Nees) N.P.Barker & H.P.Linder, endemic

Glyceria 
Genus Glyceria:
 Glyceria maxima (Hartm.) Holmb. not indigenous, naturalised, invasive

Gymnothrix 
Genus Gymnothrix:
 Gymnothrix uniseta Nees, accepted as Pennisetum unisetum (Nees) Benth. present

Hackelochloa 
Genus Hackelochloa:
 Hackelochloa granularis (L.) Kuntze, indigenous

Hainardia 
Genus Hainardia:
 Hainardia cylindrica (Willd.) Greuter, not indigenous, naturalised

Harpochloa 
Genus Harpochloa:
 Harpochloa falx (L.f.) Kuntze, indigenous

Helictotrichon 
Genus Helictotrichon:
 Helictotrichon barbatum (Nees) Schweick. endemic
 Helictotrichon capense Schweick. endemic
 Helictotrichon dodii (Stapf) Schweick. endemic
 Helictotrichon galpinii Schweick. indigenous
 Helictotrichon hirtulum (Steud.) Schweick. indigenous
 Helictotrichon leoninum (Steud.) Schweick. endemic
 Helictotrichon longifolium (Nees) Schweick. indigenous
 Helictotrichon longum (Stapf) Schweick. endemic
 Helictotrichon namaquense Schweick. endemic
 Helictotrichon natalense (Stapf) Schweick. endemic
 Helictotrichon quinquesetum (Steud.) Schweick. endemic
 Helictotrichon rogerellisii Mashau, Fish & A.E.van Wyk, indigenous
 Helictotrichon roggeveldense Mashau, Fish & A.E.van Wyk, indigenous
 Helictotrichon turgidulum (Stapf) Schweick. indigenous

Hemarthria 
Genus Hemarthria:
 Hemarthria altissima (Poir.) Stapf & C.E.Hubb. indigenous

Heteropogon 
Genus Heteropogon:
 Heteropogon contortus (L.) Roem. & Schult. indigenous
 Heteropogon melanocarpus (Elliott) Benth. indigenous

Holcus 
Genus Holcus:
 Holcus lanatus L. not indigenous, naturalised
 Holcus setiger Nees, endemic

Hordeum 
Genus Hordeum:
 Hordeum capense Thunb. indigenous
 Hordeum geniculatum All. not indigenous, naturalised
 Hordeum marinum Huds. subsp. gussoneanum (Parl.) Thell. accepted as Hordeum geniculatum All. not indigenous, naturalised
 Hordeum murinum L. subsp. murinum, not indigenous, naturalised
 Hordeum murinum L. subsp. glaucum (Steud.) Tzvelev, not indigenous, naturalised
 Hordeum murinum L. subsp. leporinum (Link) Arcang. not indigenous, naturalised
 Hordeum stenostachys Godr. not indigenous, naturalised

Hyparrhenia 
Genus Hyparrhenia:
 Hyparrhenia anamesa Clayton, indigenous
 Hyparrhenia collina (Pilg.) Stapf, indigenous
 Hyparrhenia cymbaria (L.) Stapf, indigenous
 Hyparrhenia dichroa (Steud.) Stapf, indigenous
 Hyparrhenia dregeana (Nees) Stapf ex Stent, indigenous
 Hyparrhenia filipendula (Hochst.) Stapf, indigenous
 Hyparrhenia filipendula (Hochst.) Stapf var. filipendula, indigenous
 Hyparrhenia filipendula (Hochst.) Stapf var. pilosa (Hochst.) Stapf, indigenous
 Hyparrhenia finitima (Hochst.) Andersson ex Stapf, indigenous
 Hyparrhenia gazensis (Rendle) Stapf, indigenous
 Hyparrhenia hirta (L.) Stapf, indigenous
 Hyparrhenia newtonii (Hack.) Stapf, indigenous
 Hyparrhenia newtonii (Hack.) Stapf var. macra Stapf, indigenous
 Hyparrhenia newtonii (Hack.) Stapf var. newtonii, indigenous
 Hyparrhenia nyassae (Rendle) Stapf, indigenous
 Hyparrhenia pilgeriana C.E.Hubb. indigenous
 Hyparrhenia poecilotricha (Hack.) Stapf, indigenous
 Hyparrhenia quarrei Robyns, indigenous
 Hyparrhenia rudis Stapf, indigenous
 Hyparrhenia rufa (Nees) Stapf, indigenous
 Hyparrhenia rufa (Nees) Stapf var. rufa, indigenous
 Hyparrhenia schimperi (Hochst. ex A.Rich.) Andersson ex Stapf, indigenous
 Hyparrhenia tamba (Steud.) Stapf, indigenous
 Hyparrhenia umbrosa (Hochst.) Andersson ex Clayton, indigenous
 Hyparrhenia variabilis Stapf, indigenous

Hyperthelia 
Genus Hyperthelia:
 Hyperthelia dissoluta (Nees ex Steud.) Clayton, indigenous

Imperata 
Genus Imperata:
 Imperata cylindrica (L.) Raeusch. [2], indigenous

Ischaemum 
Genus Ischaemum:
 Ischaemum afrum (J.F.Gmel.) Dandy, indigenous
 Ischaemum fasciculatum Brongn. indigenous

Karroochloa 
Genus Karroochloa:
 Karroochloa curva (Nees) Conert & Turpe, accepted as Tribolium curvum (Nees) Verboom & H.P.Linder, endemic
 Karroochloa purpurea (L.f.) Conert & Turpe, accepted as Tribolium purpureum (L.f.) Verboom & H.P.Linder, indigenous
 Karroochloa schismoides (Stapf ex Conert) Conert & Turpe, accepted as Schismus schismoides (Stapf ex Conert) Verboom & H.P.Linder, indigenous
 Karroochloa tenella (Nees) Conert & Turpe, accepted as Tribolium tenellum (Nees) Verboom & H.P.Linder, endemic

Koeleria 
Genus Koeleria:
 Koeleria capensis (Steud.) Nees, indigenous

Lagurus 
Genus Lagurus:
 Lagurus ovatus L. not indigenous, naturalised

Lamarckia 
Genus Lamarckia:
 Lamarckia aurea (L.) Moench, not indigenous, naturalised

Lasiagrostis 
Genus Lasiagrostis:
 Lasiagrostis capensis Nees, accepted as Stipa dregeana Steud. var. dregeana, present
 Lasiagrostis elongata Nees, accepted as Stipa dregeana Steud. var. dregeana, present

Lasiochloa 
Genus Lasiochloa:
 Lasiochloa alopecuroides Hack. accepted as Stiburus alopecuroides (Hack.) Stapf, present
 Lasiochloa longifolia (Schrad.) Kunth var. pallens Stapf, accepted as Tribolium hispidum (Thunb.) Desv. present

Leersia 
Genus Leersia:
 Leersia denudata Launert, indigenous
 Leersia hexandra Sw. indigenous

Leptocarydion 
Genus Leptocarydion:
 Leptocarydion vulpiastrum (De Not.) Stapf, indigenous

Leptochloa 
Genus Leptochloa:
 Leptochloa chinensis (L.) Nees, indigenous
 Leptochloa eleusine (Nees) Cope & N.Snow, indigenous
 Leptochloa fusca (L.) Kunth, indigenous
 Leptochloa panicea (Retz.) Ohwi, indigenous
 Leptochloa uniflora Hochst. ex A.Rich. indigenous

Lepturus 
Genus Lepturus:
 Lepturus repens (G.Forst.) R.Br. indigenous

Leucophrys 
Genus Leucophrys:
 Leucophrys mesocoma (Nees) Rendle, indigenous

Lintonia 
Genus Lintonia:
 Lintonia nutans Stapf, indigenous

Lolium 
Genus Lolium:
 Lolium multiflorum Lam. not indigenous, naturalised, invasive
 Lolium perenne L. not indigenous, naturalised
 Lolium rigidum Gaudin, not indigenous, naturalised
 Lolium temulentum L. not indigenous, naturalised

Lophacme 
Genus Lophacme:
 Lophacme digitata Stapf, indigenous

Lophochloa 
Genus Lophochloa:
 Lophochloa cristata (L.) Hyl. not indigenous, naturalised
 Lophochloa pumila (Desf.) Bor, not indigenous, naturalised

Loudetia 
Genus Loudetia:
 Loudetia densispica (Rendle) C.E.Hubb. indigenous
 Loudetia filifolia Schweick. indigenous
 Loudetia flavida (Stapf) C.E.Hubb. indigenous
 Loudetia pedicellata (Stent) Chippind. endemic
 Loudetia simplex (Nees) C.E.Hubb. indigenous

Maltebrunia 
Genus Maltebrunia:
 Maltebrunia prehensilis Nees, accepted as Prosphytochloa prehensilis (Nees) Schweick. present

Megaloprotachne 
Genus Megaloprotachne:
 Megaloprotachne albescens C.E.Hubb. indigenous

Megastachya 
Genus Megastachya:
 Megastachya mucronata (Poir.) P.Beauv. indigenous

Melica 
Genus Melica:
 Melica decumbens Thunb. indigenous
 Melica dendroides Lehm. accepted as Melica decumbens Thunb. present
 Melica racemosa Thunb. indigenous

Melinis 
Genus Melinis:
 Melinis affinis Mez, accepted as Melinis repens (Willd.) Zizka subsp. grandiflora (Hochst.) Zizka 
 Melinis bachmannii Mez, accepted as Melinis nerviglumis (Franch.) Zizka, present
 Melinis bertlingii Mez, accepted as Melinis repens (Willd.) Zizka subsp. grandiflora (Hochst.) Zizka 
 Melinis drakensbergensis (C.E.Hubb. & Schweick.) Clayton, endemic
 Melinis ejubata Mez, accepted as Melinis repens (Willd.) Zizka subsp. grandiflora (Hochst.) Zizka 
 Melinis longiseta (A.Rich.) Zizka, indigenous
 Melinis longiseta (A.Rich.) Zizka subsp. bellespicata (Rendle) Zizka, indigenous
 Melinis macrochaeta Stapf & C.E.Hubb. indigenous
 Melinis minutiflora P.Beauv. indigenous
 Melinis mutica Mez, accepted as Melinis repens (Willd.) Zizka subsp. grandiflora (Hochst.) Zizka 
 Melinis nerviglumis (Franch.) Zizka, indigenous
 Melinis otaviensis Mez, accepted as Melinis repens (Willd.) Zizka subsp. grandiflora (Hochst.) Zizka 
 Melinis pulchra Mez, accepted as Melinis repens (Willd.) Zizka subsp. grandiflora (Hochst.) Zizka 
 Melinis rangei Mez, accepted as Melinis repens (Willd.) Zizka subsp. grandiflora (Hochst.) Zizka 
 Melinis repens (Willd.) Zizka, indigenous
 Melinis repens (Willd.) Zizka subsp. grandiflora (Hochst.) Zizka, indigenous
 Melinis repens (Willd.) Zizka subsp. repens, indigenous
 Melinis scabrida (K.Schum.) Hack. indigenous
 Melinis secunda Mez, accepted as Melinis longiseta (A.Rich.) Zizka subsp. bellespicata (Rendle) Zizka 
 Melinis seineri Mez, accepted as Melinis repens (Willd.) Zizka subsp. grandiflora (Hochst.) Zizka 
 Melinis subglabra Mez, indigenous
 Melinis tenuissima Stapf, indigenous
 Melinis trichotoma Mez, accepted as Tricholaena monachne (Trin.) Stapf & C.E.Hubb.

Merxmuellera 
Genus Merxmuellera:
 Merxmuellera arundinacea (P.J.Bergius) Conert [2], accepted as Capeochloa arundinacea (P.J.Bergius) N.P.Barker & H.P.Linder, endemic
 Merxmuellera aureocephala (J.G.Anderson) Conert, accepted as Tenaxia aureocephala (J.G.Anderson) N.P.Barker & H.P.Linder, endemic
 Merxmuellera cincta (Nees) Conert subsp. cincta, accepted as Capeochloa cincta (Nees) N.P.Barker & H.P.Linder subsp. cincta, endemic
 Merxmuellera cincta (Nees) Conert subsp. sericea N.P.Barker, accepted as Capeochloa cincta (Nees) N.P.Barker & H.P.Linder subsp. sericea (N.P.Barker) N.P.Barker & H.P.Linder, endemic
 Merxmuellera davyi (C.E.Hubb.) Conert, indigenous
 Merxmuellera decora (Nees) Conert, accepted as Geochloa decora (Nees) N.P.Barker & H.P.Linder, endemic
 Merxmuellera disticha (Nees) Conert, accepted as Tenaxia disticha (Nees) N.P.Barker & H.P.Linder, indigenous
 Merxmuellera drakensbergensis (Schweick.) Conert, indigenous
 Merxmuellera dura (Stapf) Conert, accepted as Tenaxia dura (Stapf) N.P.Barker & H.P.Linder, endemic
 Merxmuellera guillarmodiae Conert, accepted as Tenaxia guillarmodiae (Conert) N.P.Barker & H.P.Linder, indigenous
 Merxmuellera lupulina (Thunb.) Conert, accepted as Geochloa lupulina (L.f.) N.P.Barker & H.P.Linder, endemic
 Merxmuellera macowanii (Stapf) Conert, indigenous
 Merxmuellera papposa (Nees) Conert, accepted as Ellisochloa papposa (Nees) P.M.Peterson & N.P.Barker, endemic
 Merxmuellera rangei (Pilg.) Conert, accepted as Ellisochloa rangei (Pilg.) P.M.Peterson & N.P.Barker 
 Merxmuellera rufa (Nees) Conert, accepted as Geochloa rufa (Nees) N.P.Barker & H.P.Linder, endemic
 Merxmuellera setacea N.P.Barker, accepted as Capeochloa setacea (N.P.Barker) N.P.Barker & H.P.Linder, endemic
 Merxmuellera stereophylla (J.G.Anderson) Conert, indigenous
 Merxmuellera stricta (Schrad.) Conert, accepted as Tenaxia stricta (Schrad.) N.P.Barker & H.P.Linder, indigenous

Microchloa 
Genus Microchloa:
 Microchloa altera (Rendle) Stapf var. nelsonii Stapf, accepted as Rendlia altera (Rendle) Chiov. 
 Microchloa caffra Nees, indigenous
 Microchloa kunthii Desv. indigenous

Microlaena 
Genus Microlaena:
 Microlaena stipoides (Labill.) R.Br. not indigenous, naturalised

Microstegium 
Genus Microstegium:
 Microstegium nudum (Trin.) A.Camus, indigenous

Miscanthus 
Genus Miscanthus:
 Miscanthus capensis (Nees) Andersson, accepted as Miscanthus ecklonii (Nees) Mabb. indigenous
 Miscanthus junceus (Stapf) Pilg. indigenous

Monocymbium 
Genus Monocymbium:
 Monocymbium ceresiiforme (Nees) Stapf, indigenous

Mosdenia 
Genus Mosdenia:
 Mosdenia leptostachys (Ficalho & Hiern) Clayton, endemic

Nassella 
Genus Nassella:
 Nassella neesiana (Trin. & Rupr.) Barkworth, not indigenous, naturalised
 Nassella tenuissima (Trin.) Barkworth, not indigenous, naturalised, invasive
 Nassella trichotoma (Nees) Hack. ex Arechav. not indigenous, naturalised, invasive

Nastus 
Genus Nastus:
 Nastus tessellata Nees, accepted as Thamnocalamus tessellatus (Nees) Soderstr. & R.P.Ellis, present

Odontelytrum 
Genus Odontelytrum:
 Odontelytrum abyssinicum Hack. indigenous

Odyssea 
Genus Odyssea:
 Odyssea paucinervis (Nees) Stapf, indigenous

Olyra 
Genus Olyra:
 Olyra latifolia L. not indigenous, naturalised

Oplismenus 
Genus Oplismenus:
 Oplismenus burmannii (Retz.) P.Beauv. indigenous
 Oplismenus hirtellus (L.) P.Beauv. indigenous
 Oplismenus undulatifolius (Ard.) Roem. & Schult. indigenous

Oropetium 
Genus Oropetium:
 Oropetium capense Stapf, indigenous

Oryza 
Genus Oryza:
 Oryza longistaminata A.Chev. & Roehr. indigenous
 Oryza punctata Kotschy ex Steud. indigenous

Oxyrhachis 
Genus Oxyrhachis:
 Oxyrhachis gracillima (Baker) C.E.Hubb. indigenous

Oxytenanthera 
Genus Oxytenanthera:
 Oxytenanthera abyssinica (A.Rich.) Munro, indigenous

Panicum 
Genus Panicum:
 Panicum aequinerve Nees, indigenous
 Panicum arbusculum Mez, indigenous
 Panicum arcurameum Stapf, indigenous
 Panicum bechuanense Bremek. & Oberm. indigenous
 Panicum coloratum L. indigenous
 Panicum deustum Thunb. indigenous
 Panicum dewinteri J.G.Anderson, endemic
 Panicum dregeanum Nees, indigenous
 Panicum ecklonii Nees, indigenous
 Panicum fluviicola Steud. indigenous
 Panicum genuflexum Stapf, indigenous
 Panicum gilvum Launert, indigenous
 Panicum glandulopaniculatum Renvoize, indigenous
 Panicum heterostachyum Hack. indigenous
 Panicum hians Elliott, accepted as Steinchisma hians (Elliott) Nash & Small, not indigenous, naturalised
 Panicum hygrocharis Steud. indigenous
 Panicum hymeniochilum Nees, indigenous
 Panicum impeditum Launert, indigenous
 Panicum infestum Peters, indigenous
 Panicum kalaharense Mez, indigenous
 Panicum lanipes Mez, indigenous
 Panicum laticomum Nees, indigenous
 Panicum maximum Jacq. indigenous
 Panicum miliaceum L. not indigenous, naturalised
 Panicum monticola Hook.f. indigenous
 Panicum natalense Hochst. indigenous
 Panicum novemnerve Stapf, indigenous
 Panicum parvifolium Lam. indigenous
 Panicum repens L. indigenous
 Panicum repentellum Napper, accepted as Panicum hygrocharis Steud. indigenous
 Panicum sancta-luciense Fish, endemic
 Panicum schinzii Hack. indigenous
 Panicum setinsigne Mez, accepted as Melinis repens (Willd.) Zizka subsp. grandiflora (Hochst.) Zizka, present
 Panicum silvestre Fish, endemic
 Panicum stapfianum Fourc. indigenous
 Panicum subalbidum Kunth, indigenous
 Panicum subflabellatum Stapf, indigenous
 Panicum volutans J.G.Anderson, endemic

Parapholis 
Genus Parapholis:
 Parapholis incurva (L.) C.E.Hubb. not indigenous, naturalised

Paspalidium 
Genus Paspalidium:
 Paspalidium geminatum (Forssk.) Stapf, indigenous
 Paspalidium obtusifolium (Delile) N.D.Simpson, indigenous

Paspalum 
Genus Paspalum:
 Paspalum dilatatum Poir. not indigenous, naturalised
 Paspalum distichum L. indigenous
 Paspalum notatum Flugge, not indigenous, naturalised
 Paspalum quadrifarium Lam. not indigenous, naturalised, invasive
 Paspalum scrobiculatum L. indigenous
 Paspalum urvillei Steud. not indigenous, naturalised
 Paspalum vaginatum Sw. indigenous

Pennisetum 
Genus Pennisetum:
 Pennisetum clandestinum Hochst. ex Chiov. not indigenous, naturalised, invasive
 Pennisetum glaucocladum Stapf & C.E.Hubb. indigenous
 Pennisetum glaucum (L.) R.Br. not indigenous, naturalised
 Pennisetum macrourum Trin. indigenous
 Pennisetum mezianum Leeke, indigenous
 Pennisetum natalense Stapf, indigenous
 Pennisetum purpureum Schumach. not indigenous, naturalised, invasive
 Pennisetum setaceum (Forssk.) Chiov. not indigenous, naturalised, invasive
 Pennisetum sphacelatum (Nees) T.Durand & Schinz, indigenous
 Pennisetum tenuifolium Hack. accepted as Pennisetum sphacelatum (Nees) T.Durand & Schinz, present
 Pennisetum thunbergii Kunth, indigenous
 Pennisetum unisetum (Nees) Benth. indigenous
 Pennisetum villosum R.Br. ex Fresen. not indigenous, naturalised, invasive

Pentameris 
Genus Pentameris:
 Pentameris acinosa (Stapf) Galley & H.P.Linder, indigenous
 Pentameris airoides Nees, indigenous
 Pentameris airoides Nees subsp. airoides, indigenous
 Pentameris airoides Nees subsp. jugorum (Stapf) Galley & H.P.Linder, indigenous
 Pentameris alticola (H.P.Linder) Galley & H.P.Linder, indigenous
 Pentameris ampla (Nees) Galley & H.P.Linder, indigenous
 Pentameris argentea (Stapf) Galley & H.P.Linder, indigenous
 Pentameris aristidoides (Thunb.) Galley & H.P.Linder, indigenous
 Pentameris aristifolia (Schweick.) Galley & H.P.Linder, indigenous
 Pentameris aspera (Thunb.) Galley & H.P.Linder, indigenous
 Pentameris aurea (Steud.) Galley & H.P.Linder, indigenous
 Pentameris aurea (Steud.) Galley & H.P.Linder subsp. aurea, indigenous
 Pentameris aurea (Steud.) Galley & H.P.Linder subsp. pilosogluma (McClean) Galley & H.P.Linder, indigenous
 Pentameris bachmannii (McClean) Galley & H.P.Linder, indigenous
 Pentameris barbata (Nees) Steud. indigenous
 Pentameris barbata (Nees) Steud. subsp. barbata, indigenous
 Pentameris barbata (Nees) Steud. subsp. orientalis (H.P.Linder) Galley & H.P.Linder, indigenous
 Pentameris basutorum (Stapf) Galley & H.P.Linder, indigenous
 Pentameris calcicola (H.P.Linder) Galley & H.P.Linder, indigenous
 Pentameris calcicola (H.P.Linder) Galley & H.P.Linder var. calcicola, indigenous
 Pentameris calcicola (H.P.Linder) Galley & H.P.Linder var. hirsuta (H.P.Linder) Galley & H.P.Linder, indigenous
 Pentameris capensis (Nees) Galley & H.P.Linder, indigenous
 Pentameris capillaris (Thunb.) Galley & H.P.Linder, indigenous
 Pentameris caulescens (H.P.Linder) Galley & H.P.Linder, indigenous
 Pentameris chippindalliae (H.P.Linder) Galley & H.P.Linder, indigenous
 Pentameris cirrhulosa (Nees) Steud. indigenous
 Pentameris clavata (Galley) Galley & H.P.Linder, indigenous
 Pentameris colorata (Steud.) Galley & H.P.Linder, indigenous
 Pentameris curvifolia (Schrad.) Nees, indigenous
 Pentameris densifolia (Nees) Steud. indigenous
 Pentameris dentata (L.f.) Galley & H.P.Linder, indigenous
 Pentameris distichophylla (Lehm.) Nees, endemic
 Pentameris ecklonii (Nees) Galley & H.P.Linder, indigenous
 Pentameris elegans (Nees) Steud. indigenous
 Pentameris ellisii H.P.Linder, indigenous
 Pentameris eriostoma (Nees) Steud. indigenous
 Pentameris exserta (H.P.Linder) Galley & H.P.Linder, indigenous
 Pentameris galpinii (Stapf) Galley & H.P.Linder, indigenous
 Pentameris glacialis N.P.Barker, endemic
 Pentameris glandulosa (Schrad.) Steud. indigenous
 Pentameris heptameris (Nees) Steud. indigenous
 Pentameris hirtiglumis N.P.Barker, endemic
 Pentameris holciformis (Nees) Galley & H.P.Linder, indigenous
 Pentameris horrida (Galley) Galley & H.P.Linder, indigenous
 Pentameris juncifolia (Stapf) Galley & H.P.Linder, endemic
 Pentameris lima (Nees) Steud. indigenous
 Pentameris longiglumis (Nees) Steud. indigenous
 Pentameris longiglumis (Nees) Steud. subsp. gymnocolea N.P.Barker, endemic
 Pentameris longiglumis (Nees) Steud. subsp. longiglumis, endemic
 Pentameris longipes (Stapf) Galley & H.P.Linder, indigenous
 Pentameris macrocalycina (Steud.) Schweick. endemic
 Pentameris malouinensis (Steud.) Galley & H.P.Linder, indigenous
 Pentameris microphylla (Nees) Galley & H.P.Linder, indigenous
 Pentameris montana (H.P.Linder) Galley & H.P.Linder, indigenous
 Pentameris natalensis (Stapf) Galley & H.P.Linder, indigenous
 Pentameris obtusifolia (Hochst.) Schweick. endemic
 Pentameris oreodoxa (Schweick.) Galley & H.P.Linder, indigenous
 Pentameris oreophila N.P.Barker, endemic
 Pentameris pallescens (Schrad.) Nees, indigenous
 Pentameris pallida (Thunb.) Galley & H.P.Linder, indigenous
 Pentameris patula (Nees) Steud. indigenous
 Pentameris pholiuroides (Stapf) Galley & H.P.Linder, indigenous
 Pentameris praecox (H.P.Linder) Galley & H.P.Linder, indigenous
 Pentameris pseudopallescens (H.P.Linder) Galley & H.P.Linder, indigenous
 Pentameris pungens (H.P.Linder) Galley & H.P.Linder, indigenous
 Pentameris pusilla (Nees) Galley & H.P.Linder, indigenous
 Pentameris pyrophila (H.P.Linder) Galley & H.P.Linder, indigenous
 Pentameris reflexa (H.P.Linder) Galley & H.P.Linder, indigenous
 Pentameris rigidissima (Pilg. ex H.P.Linder) Galley & H.P.Linder, indigenous
 Pentameris rosea (H.P.Linder) Galley & H.P.Linder, indigenous
 Pentameris rosea (H.P.Linder) Galley & H.P.Linder subsp. purpurascens (H.P.Linder) Galley & H.P.Lind, indigenous
 Pentameris rosea (H.P.Linder) Galley & H.P.Linder subsp. rosea, indigenous
 Pentameris rupestris (Nees) Steud. indigenous
 Pentameris scabra (Nees) Steud. indigenous
 Pentameris scandens (H.P.Linder) Galley & H.P.Linder, indigenous
 Pentameris setifolia (Thunb.) Galley & H.P.Linder, indigenous
 Pentameris swartbergensis N.P.Barker, endemic
 Pentameris thuarii P.Beauv. endemic
 Pentameris tomentella (Stapf) Galley & H.P.Linder, indigenous
 Pentameris tortuosa (Trin.) Nees, indigenous
 Pentameris trifida (Galley) Galley & H.P.Linder, indigenous
 Pentameris triseta (Thunb.) Galley & H.P.Linder, indigenous
 Pentameris tysonii (Stapf) Galley & H.P.Linder, indigenous
 Pentameris uniflora N.P.Barker, endemic
 Pentameris velutina (H.P.Linder) Galley & H.P.Linder, indigenous
 Pentameris veneta (H.P.Linder) Galley & H.P.Linder, indigenous
 Pentameris viscidula (Nees) Steud. indigenous

Pentaschistis 
Genus Pentaschistis:
 Pentaschistis acinosa Stapf, accepted as Pentameris acinosa (Stapf) Galley & H.P.Linder, endemic
 Pentaschistis airoides (Nees) Stapf subsp. airoides, accepted as Pentameris airoides Nees subsp. airoides, indigenous
 Pentaschistis airoides (Nees) Stapf subsp. jugorum (Stapf) H.P.Linder, accepted as Pentameris airoides Nees subsp. jugorum (Stapf) Galley & H.P.Linder, indigenous
 Pentaschistis alticola H.P.Linder, accepted as Pentameris alticola (H.P.Linder) Galley & H.P.Linder, endemic
 Pentaschistis ampla (Nees) McClean, accepted as Pentameris ampla (Nees) Galley & H.P.Linder, endemic
 Pentaschistis argentea Stapf, accepted as Pentameris argentea (Stapf) Galley & H.P.Linder, endemic
 Pentaschistis aristidoides (Thunb.) Stapf, accepted as Pentameris aristidoides (Thunb.) Galley & H.P.Linder, endemic
 Pentaschistis aristifolia Schweick. accepted as Pentameris aristifolia (Schweick.) Galley & H.P.Linder, endemic
 Pentaschistis aspera (Thunb.) Stapf, accepted as Pentameris aspera (Thunb.) Galley & H.P.Linder, endemic
 Pentaschistis aurea (Steud.) McClean, indigenous
 Pentaschistis aurea (Steud.) McClean subsp. aurea, accepted as Pentameris aurea (Steud.) Galley & H.P.Linder subsp. aurea, endemic
 Pentaschistis aurea (Steud.) McClean subsp. pilosogluma (McClean) H.P.Linder, indigenous
 Pentaschistis barbata (Nees) H.P.Linder subsp. barbata, accepted as Pentameris barbata (Nees) Steud. subsp. barbata, endemic
 Pentaschistis barbata (Nees) H.P.Linder subsp. orientalis H.P.Linder, accepted as Pentameris barbata (Nees) Steud. subsp. orientalis (H.P.Linder) Galley & H.P.Linder, endemic
 Pentaschistis basutorum Stapf, accepted as Pentameris basutorum (Stapf) Galley & H.P.Linder, indigenous
 Pentaschistis calcicola H.P.Linder var. calcicola, accepted as Pentameris calcicola (H.P.Linder) Galley & H.P.Linder var. calcicola, endemic
 Pentaschistis calcicola H.P.Linder var. hirsuta H.P.Linder, accepted as Pentameris calcicola (H.P.Linder) Galley & H.P.Linder var. hirsuta (H.P.Linder) Galley & H.P.Linder, endemic
 Pentaschistis capensis (Nees) Stapf, accepted as Pentameris capensis (Nees) Galley & H.P.Linder, endemic
 Pentaschistis capillaris (Thunb.) McClean, accepted as Pentameris capillaris (Thunb.) Galley & H.P.Linder, endemic
 Pentaschistis caulescens H.P.Linder, accepted as Pentameris caulescens (H.P.Linder) Galley & H.P.Linder, endemic
 Pentaschistis chippindalliae H.P.Linder, accepted as Pentameris chippindalliae (H.P.Linder) Galley & H.P.Linder, endemic
 Pentaschistis cirrhulosa (Nees) H.P.Linder, accepted as Pentameris cirrhulosa (Nees) Steud. endemic
 Pentaschistis clavata Galley, accepted as Pentameris clavata (Galley) Galley & H.P.Linder, present
 Pentaschistis colorata (Steud.) Stapf, accepted as Pentameris colorata (Steud.) Galley & H.P.Linder, endemic
 Pentaschistis curvifolia (Schrad.) Stapf, accepted as Pentameris curvifolia (Schrad.) Nees, endemic
 Pentaschistis densifolia (Nees) Stapf, accepted as Pentameris densifolia (Nees) Steud. endemic
 Pentaschistis ecklonii (Nees) McClean, accepted as Pentameris bachmannii (McClean) Galley & H.P.Linder, endemic
 Pentaschistis elegans (Nees) Stapf, accepted as Pentameris elegans (Nees) Steud. endemic
 Pentaschistis eriostoma (Nees) Stapf, accepted as Pentameris eriostoma (Nees) Steud. endemic
 Pentaschistis exserta H.P.Linder, accepted as Pentameris exserta (H.P.Linder) Galley & H.P.Linder, indigenous
 Pentaschistis galpinii (Stapf) McClean, accepted as Pentameris galpinii (Stapf) Galley & H.P.Linder, indigenous
 Pentaschistis glandulosa (Schrad.) H.P.Linder, accepted as Pentameris glandulosa (Schrad.) Steud. endemic
 Pentaschistis heptamera (Nees) Stapf, accepted as Pentameris heptameris (Nees) Steud. endemic
 Pentaschistis holciformis (Nees) H.P.Linder, accepted as Pentameris holciformis (Nees) Galley & H.P.Linder, endemic
 Pentaschistis horrida Galley, accepted as Pentameris horrida (Galley) Galley & H.P.Linder, present
 Pentaschistis juncifolia Stapf, accepted as Pentameris juncifolia (Stapf) Galley & H.P.Linder, present
 Pentaschistis lima (Nees) Stapf, accepted as Pentameris lima (Nees) Steud. endemic
 Pentaschistis longipes Stapf, accepted as Pentameris longipes (Stapf) Galley & H.P.Linder, endemic
 Pentaschistis malouinensis (Steud.) Clayton, accepted as Pentameris malouinensis (Steud.) Galley & H.P.Linder, endemic
 Pentaschistis microphylla (Nees) McClean, accepted as Pentameris microphylla (Nees) Galley & H.P.Linder, endemic
 Pentaschistis montana H.P.Linder, accepted as Pentameris montana (H.P.Linder) Galley & H.P.Linder, endemic
 Pentaschistis natalensis Stapf, accepted as Pentameris natalensis (Stapf) Galley & H.P.Linder, indigenous
 Pentaschistis oreodoxa Schweick. accepted as Pentameris oreodoxa (Schweick.) Galley & H.P.Linder, indigenous
 Pentaschistis pallescens (Schrad.) Stapf, endemic
 Pentaschistis pallida (Thunb.) H.P.Linder, endemic
 Pentaschistis papillosa (Steud.) H.P.Linder, accepted as Pentameris scabra (Nees) Steud. endemic
 Pentaschistis patula (Nees) Stapf, accepted as Pentameris patula (Nees) Steud. endemic
 Pentaschistis praecox H.P.Linder, accepted as Pentameris praecox (H.P.Linder) Galley & H.P.Linder 
 Pentaschistis pseudopallescens H.P.Linder, accepted as Pentameris pseudopallescens (H.P.Linder) Galley & H.P.Linder, endemic
 Pentaschistis pungens H.P.Linder, accepted as Pentameris pungens (H.P.Linder) Galley & H.P.Linder, endemic
 Pentaschistis pusilla (Nees) H.P.Linder, accepted as Pentameris pusilla (Nees) Galley & H.P.Linder, endemic
 Pentaschistis pyrophila H.P.Linder, accepted as Pentameris pyrophila (H.P.Linder) Galley & H.P.Linder, endemic
 Pentaschistis reflexa H.P.Linder, accepted as Pentameris reflexa (H.P.Linder) Galley & H.P.Linder, endemic
 Pentaschistis rigidissima Pilg. ex H.P.Linder, accepted as Pentameris rigidissima (Pilg. ex H.P.Linder) Galley & H.P.Linder, endemic
 Pentaschistis rosea H.P.Linder subsp. purpurascens H.P.Linder, accepted as Pentameris rosea (H.P.Linder) Galley & H.P.Linder subsp. purpurascens (H.P.Linder) Galley & H.P.Lind, endemic
 Pentaschistis rosea H.P.Linder subsp. rosea, accepted as Pentameris rosea (H.P.Linder) Galley & H.P.Linder subsp. rosea, endemic
 Pentaschistis rupestris (Nees) Stapf, accepted as Pentameris rupestris (Nees) Steud. endemic
 Pentaschistis scandens H.P.Linder, accepted as Pentameris scandens (H.P.Linder) Galley & H.P.Linder, endemic
 Pentaschistis setifolia (Thunb.) McClean, accepted as Pentameris setifolia (Thunb.) Galley & H.P.Linder, indigenous
 Pentaschistis tomentella Stapf, accepted as Pentameris tomentella (Stapf) Galley & H.P.Linder, endemic
 Pentaschistis tortuosa (Trin.) Stapf, accepted as Pentameris tortuosa (Trin.) Nees, endemic
 Pentaschistis trifida Galley, accepted as Pentameris trifida (Galley) Galley & H.P.Linder, present
 Pentaschistis triseta (Thunb.) Stapf, accepted as Pentameris triseta (Thunb.) Galley & H.P.Linder, endemic
 Pentaschistis tysonii Stapf, accepted as Pentameris tysonii (Stapf) Galley & H.P.Linder, endemic
 Pentaschistis velutina H.P.Linder, accepted as Pentameris velutina (H.P.Linder) Galley & H.P.Linder, endemic
 Pentaschistis veneta H.P.Linder, accepted as Pentameris veneta (H.P.Linder) Galley & H.P.Linder, endemic
 Pentaschistis viscidula (Nees) Stapf, accepted as Pentameris viscidula (Nees) Steud. endemic

Periballia 
Genus Periballia:
 Periballia minuta (L.) Asch. & Graebn. not indigenous, naturalised

Perotis 
Genus Perotis:
 Perotis patens Gand. indigenous

Petrina 
Genus Petrina:
 Petrina parva J.B.Phipps, accepted as Danthoniopsis parva (J.B.Phipps) Clayton, present

Phacelurus 
Genus Phacelurus:
 Phacelurus franksiae (J.M.Wood) Clayton, indigenous

Phalaris 
Genus Phalaris:
 Phalaris angusta Nees ex Trin. not indigenous, naturalised
 Phalaris aquatica L. not indigenous, naturalised
 Phalaris arundinacea L. not indigenous, naturalised
 Phalaris canariensis L. not indigenous, naturalised
 Phalaris minor Retz. not indigenous, naturalised
 Phalaris paradoxa L. not indigenous, naturalised

Phragmites 
Genus Phragmites:
 Phragmites australis (Cav.) Steud. indigenous
 Phragmites mauritianus Kunth, indigenous

Poa 
Genus Poa:
 Poa annua L. not indigenous, naturalised
 Poa binata Nees, indigenous
 Poa bulbosa L. indigenous
 Poa heterogama Hack. accepted as Poa binata Nees, present
 Poa leptoclada Hochst. ex A.Rich. indigenous
 Poa pratensis L. not indigenous, naturalised, invasive
 Poa trivialis L. not indigenous, naturalised

Pogonarthria 
Genus Pogonarthria:
 Pogonarthria squarrosa (Roem. & Schult.) Pilg. indigenous

Polevansia 
Genus Polevansia:
 Polevansia rigida De Winter, indigenous

Polypogon 
Genus Polypogon:
 Polypogon monspeliensis (L.) Desf. not indigenous, naturalised
 Polypogon strictus Nees, endemic
 Polypogon viridis (Gouan) Breistr. not indigenous, naturalised

Prionanthium 
Genus Prionanthium:
 Prionanthium dentatum (L.f.) Henrard, accepted as Pentameris dentata (L.f.) Galley & H.P.Linder, endemic
 Prionanthium ecklonii (Nees) Stapf, accepted as Pentameris ecklonii (Nees) Galley & H.P.Linder, endemic
 Prionanthium pholiuroides Stapf, accepted as Pentameris pholiuroides (Stapf) Galley & H.P.Linder, endemic

Prosphytochloa 
Genus Prosphytochloa:
 Prosphytochloa prehensilis (Nees) Schweick. indigenous

Pseudechinolaena 
Genus Pseudechinolaena:
 Pseudechinolaena polystachya (Kunth) Stapf, indigenous
 Pseudopentameris brachyphylla (Stapf) Conert, endemic
 Pseudopentameris caespitosa N.P.Barker, endemic
 Pseudopentameris macrantha (Schrad.) Conert, endemic
 Pseudopentameris obtusifolia (Hochst.) N.P.Barker, accepted as Pentameris obtusifolia (Hochst.) Schweick. endemic

Puccinellia 
Genus Puccinellia:
 Puccinellia acroxantha C.A.Sm. & C.E.Hubb. indigenous
 Puccinellia angusta (Nees) C.A.Sm. & C.E.Hubb. endemic
 Puccinellia distans (L.) Parl. not indigenous, naturalised
 Puccinellia fasciculata (Torr.) E.P.Bicknell, not indigenous, naturalised

Rendlia 
Genus Rendlia:
 Rendlia altera (Rendle) Chiov. indigenous

Rhytachne 
Genus Rhytachne:
 Rhytachne latifolia Clayton, indigenous
 Rhytachne rottboellioides Desv. indigenous

Rottboellia 
Genus Rottboellia:
 Rottboellia cochinchinensis (Lour.) Clayton, indigenous

Sacciolepis 
Genus Sacciolepis:
 Sacciolepis africana C.E.Hubb. & Snowden, indigenous
 Sacciolepis chevalieri Stapf, indigenous
 Sacciolepis curvata (L.) Chase, indigenous
 Sacciolepis indica (L.) Chase, indigenous
 Sacciolepis spiciformis (A.Rich.) Stapf, indigenous
 Sacciolepis typhura (Stapf) Stapf, indigenous

Sartidia 
Genus Sartidia:
 Sartidia dewinteri Munday & Fish, indigenous
 Sartidia jucunda (Schweick.) De Winter, endemic

Sasa 
Genus Sasa:
 Sasa ramosa Makino & Shibata, not indigenous, naturalised, invasive

Schismus 
Genus Schismus:
 Schismus barbatus (Loefl. ex L.) Thell. indigenous
 Schismus inermis (Stapf) C.E.Hubb. endemic
 Schismus pleuropogon Stapf, accepted as Tribolium curvum (Nees) Verboom & H.P.Linder, endemic
 Schismus scaberrimus Nees, endemic
 Schismus schismoides (Stapf ex Conert) Verboom & H.P.Linder, indigenous

Schizachyrium 
Genus Schizachyrium:
 Schizachyrium brevifolium (Sw.) Nees ex Buse, indigenous
 Schizachyrium exile (Hochst.) Pilg. indigenous
 Schizachyrium jeffreysii (Hack.) Stapf, indigenous
 Schizachyrium rupestre (K.Schum.) Stapf, indigenous
 Schizachyrium sanguineum (Retz.) Alston, indigenous
 Schizachyrium ursulus Stapf, indigenous

Schmidtia 
Genus Schmidtia:
 Schmidtia glabra Pilg. accepted as Schmidtia pappophoroides Steud. present
 Schmidtia kalahariensis Stent, indigenous
 Schmidtia pappophoroides Steud. indigenous

Schoenefeldia 
Genus Schoenefeldia:
 Schoenefeldia transiens (Pilg.) Chiov. indigenous

Sclerochloa 
Genus Sclerochloa:
 Sclerochloa angusta Nees, accepted as Puccinellia angusta (Nees) C.A.Sm. & C.E.Hubb. present

Secale 
Genus Secale:
 Secale africanum Stapf, accepted as Secale strictum (J.Presl) J.Presl subsp. africanum (Stapf) K.Hammer, present
 Secale strictum (J.Presl) J.Presl, indigenous
 Secale strictum (J.Presl) J.Presl subsp. africanum (Stapf) K.Hammer, endemic

Sehima 
Genus Sehima:
 Sehima galpinii Stent, indigenous
 Sehima ischaemoides Forssk. indigenous

Setaria 
Genus Setaria:
 Setaria appendiculata (Hack.) Stapf, indigenous
 Setaria chevalieri Stapf, accepted as Setaria megaphylla (Steud.) T.Durand & Schinz, present
 Setaria chevalieri Stapf subsp. racemosa de Wit, accepted as Setaria megaphylla (Steud.) T.Durand & Schinz, present
 Setaria geniculata (Lam.) P.Beauv. not indigenous, naturalised
 Setaria homonyma (Steud.) Chiov. indigenous
 Setaria incrassata (Hochst.) Hack. indigenous
 Setaria italica (L.) P.Beauv. not indigenous, naturalised
 Setaria laeta de Wit, endemic
 Setaria lindenbergiana (Nees) Stapf, indigenous
 Setaria megaphylla (Steud.) T.Durand & Schinz, indigenous
 Setaria nigrirostris (Nees) T.Durand & Schinz, indigenous
 Setaria nigrirostris (Nees) T.Durand & Schinz var. pallida de Wit, accepted as Setaria incrassata (Hochst.) Hack. present
 Setaria obscura de Wit, endemic
 Setaria pallide-fusca (Schumach.) Stapf & C.E.Hubb. accepted as Setaria pumila (Poir.) Roem. & Schult. present
 Setaria plicatilis (Hochst.) Hack. ex Engl. indigenous
 Setaria pumila (Poir.) Roem. & Schult. indigenous
 Setaria rigida Stapf, indigenous
 Setaria sagittifolia (A.Rich.) Walp. indigenous
 Setaria sphacelata (Schumach.) Stapf & C.E.Hubb. ex M.B.Moss, indigenous
 Setaria sphacelata (Schumach.) Stapf & C.E.Hubb. ex M.B.Moss var. sericea (Stapf) Clayton, indigenous
 Setaria sphacelata (Schumach.) Stapf & C.E.Hubb. ex M.B.Moss var. sphacelata, indigenous
 Setaria sphacelata (Schumach.) Stapf & C.E.Hubb. ex M.B.Moss var. splendida (Stapf) Clayton, indigenous
 Setaria sphacelata (Schumach.) Stapf & C.E.Hubb. ex M.B.Moss var. torta (Stapf) Clayton, indigenous
 Setaria ustilata de Wit, accepted as Setaria pumila (Poir.) Roem. & Schult. present
 Setaria verticillata (L.) P.Beauv. indigenous

Sorghastrum 
Genus Sorghastrum:
 Sorghastrum friesii (Pilg.) Pilg. accepted as Sorghastrum nudipes Nash, present
 Sorghastrum nudipes Nash, indigenous
 Sorghastrum stipoides (Kunth) Nash, indigenous

Sorghum 
Genus Sorghum:
 Sorghum bicolor (L.) Moench, indigenous
 Sorghum bicolor (L.) Moench subsp. arundinaceum (Desv.) de Wet & Harlan, indigenous
 Sorghum bicolor (L.) Moench subsp. drummondii (Steud.) de Wet, indigenous
 Sorghum halepense (L.) Pers. not indigenous, naturalised, invasive
 Sorghum versicolor Andersson, indigenous

Spartina 
Genus Spartina:
 Spartina alterniflora Loisel. not indigenous, naturalised, invasive
 Spartina maritima (Curtis) Fernald, indigenous

Sphenopus 
Genus Sphenopus:
 Sphenopus divaricatus (Gouan) Rchb. not indigenous, naturalised

Sporobolus 
Genus Sporobolus:
 Sporobolus acinifolius Stapf, indigenous
 Sporobolus africanus (Poir.) Robyns & Tournay, indigenous
 Sporobolus albicans (Nees ex Trin.) Nees, indigenous
 Sporobolus centrifugus (Trin.) Nees, indigenous
 Sporobolus congoensis Franch. indigenous
 Sporobolus conrathii Chiov. indigenous
 Sporobolus consimilis Fresen. indigenous
 Sporobolus coromandelianus (Retz.) Kunth, indigenous
 Sporobolus discosporus Nees, indigenous
 Sporobolus engleri Pilg. indigenous
 Sporobolus festivus Hochst. ex A.Rich. indigenous
 Sporobolus fimbriatus (Trin.) Nees, indigenous
 Sporobolus fourcadii Stent, endemic
 Sporobolus gillii Stent, accepted as Sporobolus ioclados (Trin.) Nees, present
 Sporobolus ioclados (Trin.) Nees, indigenous
 Sporobolus kentrophyllus (K.Schum.) Clayton, accepted as Sporobolus ioclados (Trin.) Nees 
 Sporobolus ludwigii Hochst. indigenous
 Sporobolus molleri Hack. indigenous
 Sporobolus natalensis (Steud.) T.Durand & Schinz, indigenous
 Sporobolus nebulosus Hack. indigenous
 Sporobolus nervosus Hochst. indigenous
 Sporobolus nitens Stent, indigenous
 Sporobolus oxyphyllus Fish, endemic
 Sporobolus panicoides A.Rich. indigenous
 Sporobolus parvulus Stent, accepted as Sporobolus coromandelianus (Retz.) Kunth, present
 Sporobolus pectinatus Hack. endemic
 Sporobolus pyramidalis P.Beauv. indigenous
 Sporobolus rangei Pilg. indigenous
 Sporobolus rehmannii Hack. accepted as Sporobolus fimbriatus (Trin.) Nees, present
 Sporobolus salsus Mez, indigenous
 Sporobolus sanguineus Rendle, indigenous
 Sporobolus spicatus (Vahl) Kunth, indigenous
 Sporobolus stapfianus Gand. indigenous
 Sporobolus subtilis Kunth, indigenous
 Sporobolus subulatus Hack. indigenous
 Sporobolus tenellus (Spreng.) Kunth, indigenous
 Sporobolus transvaalensis Gooss. accepted as Sporobolus albicans (Nees ex Trin.) Nees, present
 Sporobolus virginicus (L.) Kunth, indigenous
 Sporobolus vryburgensis Stent, accepted as Sporobolus ioclados (Trin.) Nees, present
 Sporobolus welwitschii Rendle, indigenous

Steinchisma 
Genus Steinchisma:
 Steinchisma hians (Elliott) Nash & Small, not indigenous, naturalised

Stenotaphrum 
Genus Stenotaphrum:
 Stenotaphrum dimidiatum (L.) Brongn. indigenous
 Stenotaphrum secundatum (Walter) Kuntze, indigenous

Stereochlaena 
Genus Stereochlaena:
 Stereochlaena cameronii (Stapf) Pilg. indigenous

Stiburus 
Genus Stiburus:
 Stiburus alopecuroides (Hack.) Stapf, indigenous
 Stiburus conrathii Hack. indigenous

Stipa 
Genus Stipa:
 Stipa capensis Thunb. indigenous
 Stipa clandestina Hack. accepted as Amelichloa clandestina (Hack.) Arriaga & Barkworth, not indigenous, naturalised
 Stipa dregeana Steud. indigenous
 Stipa dregeana Steud. var. dregeana, endemic
 Stipa dregeana Steud. var. elongata (Nees) Stapf, indigenous
 Stipa papposa Nees, accepted as Jarava plumosa (Spreng.) S.W.L.Jacobs & J.Everett, not indigenous, naturalised
 Stipa variabilis Hughes, accepted as Austrostipa variabilis (Hughes) S.W.L.Jacobs & J.Everett, not indigenous, naturalised

Stipagrostis 
Genus Stipagrostis:
 Stipagrostis amabilis (Schweick.) De Winter, indigenous
 Stipagrostis anomala De Winter, indigenous
 Stipagrostis brevifolia (Nees) De Winter, indigenous
 Stipagrostis ciliata (Desf.) De Winter, indigenous
 Stipagrostis ciliata (Desf.) De Winter var. capensis (Trin. & Rupr.) De Winter, indigenous
 Stipagrostis dregeana Nees, indigenous
 Stipagrostis fastigiata (Hack.) De Winter, indigenous
 Stipagrostis geminifolia Nees, indigenous
 Stipagrostis hirtigluma (Steud.) De Winter, indigenous
 Stipagrostis hirtigluma (Steud.) De Winter subsp. patula (Hack.) De Winter, indigenous
 Stipagrostis hirtigluma (Steud.) De Winter subsp. pearsonii (Henrard) De Winter, indigenous
 Stipagrostis hochstetteriana (Beck ex Hack.) De Winter, indigenous
 Stipagrostis hochstetteriana (Beck ex Hack.) De Winter var. hochstetteriana, indigenous
 Stipagrostis hochstetteriana (Beck ex Hack.) De Winter var. secalina (Henrard) De Winter, indigenous
 Stipagrostis lutescens (Nees) De Winter, indigenous
 Stipagrostis lutescens (Nees) De Winter var. lutescens, indigenous
 Stipagrostis namaquensis (Nees) De Winter, indigenous
 Stipagrostis obtusa (Delile) Nees, indigenous
 Stipagrostis proxima (Steud.) De Winter, endemic
 Stipagrostis schaeferi (Mez) De Winter, indigenous
 Stipagrostis subacaulis (Nees) De Winter, indigenous
 Stipagrostis uniplumis (Licht.) De Winter, indigenous
 Stipagrostis uniplumis (Licht.) De Winter var. neesii (Trin. & Rupr.) De Winter, indigenous
 Stipagrostis uniplumis (Licht.) De Winter var. uniplumis, indigenous
 Stipagrostis zeyheri (Nees) De Winter, indigenous
 Stipagrostis zeyheri (Nees) De Winter subsp. barbata (Stapf) De Winter, endemic
 Stipagrostis zeyheri (Nees) De Winter subsp. macropus (Nees) De Winter, indigenous
 Stipagrostis zeyheri (Nees) De Winter subsp. sericans (Hack.) De Winter, indigenous
 Stipagrostis zeyheri (Nees) De Winter subsp. zeyheri, endemic

Streblochaete 
Genus Streblochaete:
 Streblochaete longiarista (A.Rich.) Pilg. indigenous

Styppeiochloa 
Genus Styppeiochloa:
 Styppeiochloa gynoglossa (Gooss.) De Winter, indigenous

Tarigidia 
Genus Tarigidia:
 Tarigidia aequiglumis (Gooss.) Stent, indigenous

Tenaxia 
Genus Tenaxia:
 Tenaxia aureocephala (J.G.Anderson) N.P.Barker & H.P.Linder, indigenous
 Tenaxia disticha (Nees) N.P.Barker & H.P.Linder, indigenous
 Tenaxia dura (Stapf) N.P.Barker & H.P.Linder, indigenous
 Tenaxia guillarmodiae (Conert) N.P.Barker & H.P.Linder, indigenous
 Tenaxia stricta (Schrad.) N.P.Barker & H.P.Linder, indigenous

Tetrachne 
Genus Tetrachne:
 Tetrachne dregei Nees, indigenous

Tetrapogon 
Genus Tetrapogon:
 Tetrapogon tenellus (Roxb.) Chiov. indigenous

Thamnocalamus 
Genus Thamnocalamus:
 Thamnocalamus tessellatus (Nees) Soderstr. & R.P.Ellis, indigenous

Themeda 
Genus Themeda:
 Themeda triandra Forssk. indigenous

Thinopyrum 
Genus Thinopyrum:
 Thinopyrum distichum (Thunb.) A.Love, not indigenous, naturalised

Trachypogon 
Genus Trachypogon:
 Trachypogon spicatus (L.f.) Kuntze, indigenous

Tragus 
Genus Tragus:
 Tragus berteronianus Schult. indigenous
 Tragus koelerioides Asch. indigenous
 Tragus racemosus (L.) All. indigenous

Tribolium 
Genus Tribolium:
 Tribolium acutiflorum (Nees) Renvoize, endemic
 Tribolium alternans (Nees) Renvoize, accepted as Tribolium uniolae (L.f.) Renvoize, present
 Tribolium amplexum Renvoize, accepted as Tribolium uniolae (L.f.) Renvoize, present
 Tribolium brachystachyum (Nees) Renvoize, endemic
 Tribolium ciliare (Stapf) Renvoize, endemic
 Tribolium curvum (Nees) Verboom & H.P.Linder, indigenous
 Tribolium echinatum (Thunb.) Renvoize, endemic
 Tribolium hispidum (Thunb.) Desv. endemic
 Tribolium obliterum (Hemsl.) Renvoize, endemic
 Tribolium obtusifolium (Nees) Renvoize, endemic
 Tribolium pleuropogon (Stapf) Verboom & H.P.Linder, accepted as Tribolium curvum (Nees) Verboom & H.P.Linder, indigenous
 Tribolium purpureum (L.f.) Verboom & H.P.Linder, indigenous
 Tribolium pusillum (Nees) H.P.Linder & Davidse, endemic
 Tribolium tenellum (Nees) Verboom & H.P.Linder, indigenous
 Tribolium uniolae (L.f.) Renvoize, endemic
 Tribolium utriculosum (Nees) Renvoize, endemic

Tricholaena 
Genus Tricholaena:
 Tricholaena capensis (Licht. ex Roem. & Schult.) Nees, indigenous
 Tricholaena capensis (Licht. ex Roem. & Schult.) Nees subsp. capensis, indigenous
 Tricholaena monachne (Trin.) Stapf & C.E.Hubb. indigenous

Trichoneura 
Genus Trichoneura:
 Trichoneura eleusinoides (Rendle) Ekman, indigenous
 Trichoneura eleusinoides (Rendle) Ekman subsp. limpopoensis Fish, endemic
 Trichoneura grandiglumis (Nees) Ekman, indigenous

Trichopteryx 
Genus Trichopteryx:
 Trichopteryx dregeana Nees, indigenous

Tripogon 
Genus Tripogon:
 Tripogon minimus (A.Rich.) Steud. indigenous

Triraphis 
Genus Triraphis:
 Triraphis andropogonoides (Steud.) E.Phillips, indigenous
 Triraphis purpurea Hack. indigenous
 Triraphis ramosissima Hack. indigenous
 Triraphis rehmannii Hack. accepted as Triraphis andropogonoides (Steud.) E.Phillips, present
 Triraphis schinzii Hack. indigenous

Tristachya 
Genus Tristachya:
 Tristachya biseriata Stapf, endemic
 Tristachya leucothrix Trin. ex Nees, indigenous
 Tristachya rehmannii Hack. indigenous

Urelytrum 
Genus Urelytrum:
 Urelytrum agropyroides (Hack.) Hack. indigenous

Urochlaena 
Genus Urochlaena:
 Urochlaena major Rendle, accepted as Tribolium pusillum (Nees) H.P.Linder & Davidse, present
 Urochlaena pusilla Nees, accepted as Tribolium pusillum (Nees) H.P.Linder & Davidse, present

Urochloa 
Genus Urochloa:
 Urochloa brachyura (Hack.) Stapf, indigenous
 Urochloa mosambicensis (Hack.) Dandy, indigenous
 Urochloa oligotricha (Fig. & De Not.) Henrard, indigenous
 Urochloa panicoides P.Beauv. indigenous
 Urochloa stolonifera (Gooss.) Chippind. indigenous
 Urochloa trichopus (Hochst.) Stapf, indigenous

Vetiveria 
Genus Vetiveria:
 Vetiveria nigritana (Benth.) Stapf, accepted as Chrysopogon nigritanus (Benth.) Veldkamp

Vulpia 
Genus Vulpia:
 Vulpia bromoides (L.) Gray, not indigenous, naturalised
 Vulpia fasciculata (Forssk.) Samp. not indigenous, naturalised
 Vulpia megastachya Nees, accepted as Festuca vulpioides Steud. present
 Vulpia muralis (Kunth) Nees, not indigenous, naturalised
 Vulpia myuros (L.) C.C.Gmel. not indigenous, naturalised

References

South African plant biodiversity lists
Poaceae